Franklin Buchanan (September 17, 1800 – May 11, 1874) was an officer in the United States Navy who became the only full admiral in the Confederate Navy during the American Civil War. He also commanded the ironclad CSS Virginia.

Early life 
Franklin Buchanan was born in Baltimore, Maryland, on September 13, 1800. He was the fifth child and third son of a physician, George Buchanan, and Laetitia McKean Buchanan. The Buchanan side of his family arrived in the United States from Scotland. His paternal grandfather was a general with the Maryland Militia during the Revolutionary War while his maternal grandfather Thomas McKean was one of the signers of the Declaration of Independence.

He joined the U.S. Navy on January 28, 1815 and became a midshipman; he was promoted to lieutenant on January 13, 1825, commander on September 8, 1841, and then captain on September 14, 1855.

On February 19, 1835, at Annapolis, Maryland, he married Ann Catherine Lloyd. They had nine children: eight daughters and a son.

U.S. Navy 
During the 45 years he served in the U.S. Navy, Buchanan had extensive and worldwide sea duty. He commanded the sloops of war  and  during the 1840s and the steam frigate  in the Perry Expedition to Japan from 1852–1854. In 1845, at the request of the U.S. Secretary of the Navy, he submitted plans to his superiors proposing a naval school which would lead to the creation of the United States Naval Academy that very year; for his efforts, he was appointed the first superintendent of the Naval School—its first name—where he served in 1845–1847. This assignment was followed by notable Mexican–American War service in 1847–1848. From 1859–1861, Buchanan was the commandant of the Washington Navy Yard.

With the Civil War upon him, he resigned his commission on April 22, 1861, expecting his home State of Maryland to eventually secede. When that did not happen, he tried to recall his resignation, but U.S. Secretary of the Navy, Gideon Welles said he did not want traitors or half-hearted patriots in his navy and refused to reinstate him. Thus in May 1861 he was out of the U.S. Navy.

Civil War 

On September 5, 1861, Franklin Buchanan joined the Confederate Navy and was given a captain's commission. On February 24, 1862, the Confederate States Secretary of the Navy, Stephen Mallory, appointed Buchanan to the office of Confederate Navy James River Squadron Flag Officer and he then selected the newly built ironclad  to be his flagship.

Buchanan was the captain of CSS Virginia (formerly ) during the Battle of Hampton Roads in Virginia. He soon was brought down by a sharpshooter's minie ball to the thigh. He would eventually recover from his leg wound. He did not get to command Virginia against . That honor went to Catesby ap Roger Jones.

In August 1862, Buchanan was promoted to the rank of full admiral – the only officer so honored in the Confederate Navy – and was sent to take command of Confederate naval forces stationed at Mobile Bay, Alabama. He oversaw the construction of the ironclad , of which the keel was laid in October 1862. He was on board Tennessee during the Battle of Mobile Bay with Rear Admiral David Glasgow Farragut's Union fleet on August 5, 1864. Wounded and taken prisoner, Buchanan was not exchanged until February 1865.

Later life 
Following the conflict, Buchanan lived in Maryland and in Mobile, Alabama, until 1870, when he again took up residence in Maryland. He died there on May 11, 1874. He is buried at the Wye House family plot outside Easton, Maryland.

Legacy 
The superintendent's quarters at the United States Naval Academy is named the Buchanan House and a street on the Academy grounds is named Buchanan Road. However, in 2023, a naming commission created by federal law to reexamine Confederate-related names and symbols on military installations recommended that Buchanan House and Buchanan Road be renamed.

See also 

 List of Superintendents of the United States Naval Academy

References

Bibliography 
 .
 .
  Online

External links 

 Photos of Buchanan – from the Naval Historical Center, Washington, D.C.
 Franklin Buchanan Naval Papers, 1796–1847 (bulk 1817–1847) MS 1 held by Special Collections & Archives , Nimitz Library  at the United States Naval Academy 

United States Navy officers
Confederate States Navy admirals
American people of Scottish descent
Battle of Hampton Roads
Superintendents of the United States Naval Academy
Presidents of the University of Maryland, College Park
Military personnel from Baltimore
1800 births
1874 deaths